Lian is a given name, and may refer to:

Given Name
 Gao Lian (dramatist) (16th century), Chinese writer
 Hu Lien (1907–1977), Chinese general
 Ju Lian (1828–1904), Chinese painter
 Lian Ann Tan (born 1947), Chinese Singaporean chess master
 Lian Ross (born 1962), German singer
 Lian Wharton (born 1977), English cricketer
 Song Lian (1310–1381), Chinese historian
 Su Lian Tan (born 1964), Malaysian American composer
 Tan Lian Hoe (21st century), Malaysian politician
 Yang Lian (born 1955), Chinese poet
 Yang Lian (weightlifter) (born 1982), Chinese weightlifter

Fictional
 Lian Harper, daughter of Roy Harper and Cheshire in the DC Comics universe
 Lian, playable character in the game Paladins